Phosphate Hill Power Station is located 150 km south of Mount Isa, Queensland, Australia. It is natural gas powered with six  Solar Taurus 60 gas turbines and one Siemens steam turbine that generate a combined capacity of approx 30 MW of electricity. Emergency black start capacity is provided from 2 Caterpillar 3516 diesel generators.

Phosphate Hill was commissioned in March 2000.

See also

List of active power stations in Queensland

References

External links
Clough Engineering press release on Phosphate Hill

Natural gas-fired power stations in Queensland
North West Queensland